St. John's Episcopal Church is a parish of the Diocese of Iowa, located in Dubuque, Iowa, United States. The church was included as a contributing property in the Jackson Park Historic District that was listed on the National Register of Historic Places in 1986.

History

The Rev. Henry Tullidge arrived at Grace Church in Galena, Illinois in November 1834 as a missionary supported by Grace Church in Providence, Rhode Island. The first services in Dubuque were held sometime not long after his arrival. Tullidge served the spiritual needs of people in the surrounding area. St. John's parish in Dubuque was organized in 1845 and a brick church was built on the corner of Ninth and Locust Streets. The parish continued to grow, but the American Civil War delayed any plans for a new church. A parish woman's organization raised the money to buy the property on the corner of Loras and Main Streets. At the time a tenement named Norton's Rookery stood on the site.

Construction of the present church began in 1875 and it was completed three years later. The church was designed in the High Victorian Gothic style by New York architect Henry M. Congdon. The rough-cut limestone for the walls was quarried in nearby Farley, Iowa. The church follows a cross-shaped plan. It features a crenelated corner tower, recessed entryways, a rose window, roof dormers, and a shorter tower toward the back of the church that is capped by a spire. The larger tower was also designed to have an upper tower and a spire, but they were never built. Five of the stained glass windows are from Louis Comfort Tiffany's studio.

References

External links

 St. John's Website
 

Religious organizations established in 1844
1844 establishments in Iowa Territory
Churches completed in 1878
19th-century Episcopal church buildings
Episcopal church buildings in Iowa
Churches in Dubuque, Iowa
Gothic Revival church buildings in Iowa
Churches on the National Register of Historic Places in Iowa
National Register of Historic Places in Dubuque, Iowa
Historic district contributing properties in Iowa